Brendan Connolly (born 15 September 1985) is a Canadian-born British ice hockey player for Sheffield Steelers and the British national team.

He represented Great Britain at the 2021 IIHF World Championship.

References

External links

1985 births
Living people
Abbotsford Heat players
Adirondack Phantoms players
Alaska Aces (ECHL) players
Belfast Giants players
Brooks Bandits players
Canadian expatriate ice hockey players in England
Canadian expatriate ice hockey players in Germany
Canadian expatriate ice hockey players in Hungary
Canadian expatriate ice hockey players in the United States
Canadian ice hockey centres
Canmore Eagles players
Elmira Jackals (ECHL) players
English ice hockey centres
Fehérvár AV19 players
Ferris State Bulldogs men's ice hockey players
Glasgow Clan players
Greenville Road Warriors players
Greenville Swamp Rabbits players
Ice hockey people from Alberta
People from Canmore, Alberta
Rungsted Seier Capital players
SC Riessersee players
Sheffield Steelers players
Texas Stars players
Canadian expatriate ice hockey players in Northern Ireland
Canadian expatriate ice hockey players in Scotland
Canadian expatriate ice hockey players in Denmark
Naturalised citizens of the United Kingdom